Ahead of Time is a 2004 Icelandic musical comedy film directed by Ágúst Guðmundsson. It is about the comeback of the band Stuðmenn, known from Ágúst Guðmundsson's 1982 film On Top.

Cast
 Gísli Marteinn Baldursson as himself
 Helga Braga Jónsdóttir as Urður
 Andrea Gylfadóttir as Verðandi
 Ragnhildur Gísladóttir as Harpa Sjöfn Hermundardóttir
 Jakob Magnússon as Frímann Flygering
 Stefan B. Onundarson as Band member
 Hrönn Steingrímsdóttir as Skuld
 Stuðmenn
 Tómas M. Tómasson as Skafti Sævarsson
 Þórður Árnason as Baldvin Roy Pálmason
 Egill Ólafsson as Kristinn Styrkársson Proppé
 Höskuldur Ólafsson as Kári Már Hörpuson
 Ásgeir Óskarsson as Hafþór Ægisson
 Eggert Þorleifsson as Dúddi

Reception
Variety's Robert Koehler wrote:
This half-cracked cousin of Abba may be worthy of an extended video, but at feature length, goofball exercise gets lost in the Icelandic snow. ... Nearly every scene here is punctuated by a musical number, some recalling Jacques Demy, others resembling Europeanized MTV videos, and all trying extremely hard to be funny. This effort to be humorous makes Ahead of Time play like a wildly overextended joke on the theme of the folly of old rockers trying once again to get their groove on.

References

2000s musical comedy films
Films about musical groups
Films directed by Ágúst Guðmundsson
Icelandic comedy films
2000s Icelandic-language films
2004 comedy films
2004 films